Neil James (14 February 1961 – 17 December 2014) was an English professional rugby league footballer who played in the 1980s and 1990s.

Background
Neil James was born in Castleford, West Riding of Yorkshire, England, and he died aged 53.

Playing career

International honours
Neil James won a cap for Great Britain while at Halifax, playing right-, i.e. number 12, scored a try, and was man of the match in the 24-10 victory over France at Central Park, Wigan on Saturday 1 March 1986.

Challenge Cup Final appearances
Neil James played as an interchange/substitute (replacing  Ben Beevers on 70-minutes) in Halifax's 19-18 victory over St. Helens in the 1987 Challenge Cup Final during the 1986–87 season at Wembley Stadium, London on Saturday 2 May 1987, and played left-, i.e. number 8, and scored a try in the 12-32 defeat by Wigan in the 1988 Challenge Cup Final during the 1987–88 season at Wembley Stadium, London on Saturday 30 April 1988.

County Cup Final appearances
Neil James played as a right-, i.e. number 12, in Castleford's 2-13 defeat by Hull F.C. in the 1983 Yorkshire County Cup Final during the 1983–84 season at Elland Road, Leeds on Saturday 15 October 1983.

Championship appearances

References

External links
!Great Britain Statistics at englandrl.co.uk (statistics currently missing due to not having appeared for both Great Britain, and England)
Statistics at rugbyleagueproject.org
Statistics at thecastlefordtigers.co.uk
(archived by web.archive.org) Wembley Star, Neil James Recently Passed Away
(archived by web.archive.org) RIP Neil James & Joe Anderson

1961 births
2014 deaths
Castleford Tigers players
English rugby league players
Gold Coast Chargers players
Great Britain national rugby league team players
Halifax R.L.F.C. players
Leeds Rhinos players
Rugby league players from Castleford
Rugby league props
Rugby league second-rows
Sheffield Eagles (1984) players